The New Unified School Council (CENU) was an education institution that was created on July 27, 1936 in Barcelona. 

A new school was created to be free, secular, co-educational, in Catalan, and based on Libertarian principles. The new school regime was inspired by the rationalist principles of work, ensuring that all workers could arrive from the primary school to the studies superiors according to its capacity.

The purpose of the decree was to coordinate education and to organize suitable buildings. It was a considerable challenge when in 1930 there were 3049 schools in all of Catalonia and it took almost twice as many (5641) to be able to meet the needs of literacy and basic education. The situation was comparable to the Balearic Islands (248 schools to build) and the Valencian Country (2450 schools to build). The pedagogical purpose was to promulgate to all a basic and solid culture that makes them men developed in all the aspects, able to contribute concrete activities, to the benefit of the same individuals and the society generally.

The libertarian pedagogue and anarchist Joan Puig i Elias (1898–1972) was the initiator of the CENU, continuing the work of Francesc Ferrer i Guàrdia. He studied teaching at the Escola Normal de Barcelona and obtained the title of teacher in 1919. His pedagogy put the child at the center of education. He educated not only reason but also feelings, with constant contact with nature. Affiliated to the CNT from his youth, from 1932 he chaired the section of teachers of the Union of Intellectuals and Liberal Professionals of Barcelona. In July 1936 he held the presidency of the Council of the New Unified School (CENU). The institution was dissolved in February 1939 by the Francoist dictatorship.

The New School and the Council

History
Most anarchist educators referenced the pedagogue Francesc Ferrer i Guardia, he had been executed in 1909 as a scapegoat for the insurrection known as Tragic Week. As a result of his influence on education, creating the so-called Modern School, numerous rationalist schools had been created throughout the country. Especially in Catalunya, rationalist education had many supporters in the labor movement. Joan Puig i Elías, the education counselor of the Central Committee of Antifascist Militias, came from this tradition. 

The New Unified School Council was created from the Spanish Revolution of 1936, its goal was to organize the new teaching system, "ensuring that it responded, in all the aspects, to the new order imposed by the will of the workers”. The Committee was made up of delegates from trade unions and left-wing political parties. The spirit that drove this Educational Council (CENU) was that of anti-fascist unity, which had led to the creation of the CCMA itself as well as its Economic Council, which little by little would be in charge of promoting industrial communities and the socialization of the economy. The Executive Committee was chaired by the already appointed Joan Puig i Elias.

On July 27, 1936, the New Unified School Council was established. The decree of creation affirmed its will to suppress the confessional school (in the hands of the Church), which was accused of being the type of educational system that has caused the military coup. They believed in a new school that promoted rationalistic principles and solidarity. In addition to these intentions, the anarchists - in charge of this council - realized that they did not have enough teachers or sufficient infrastructure to offer a teaching based on libertarian ideas. Therefore Puig i Elias resolved to come to an understanding with the Republicans, the Catalanists and the Socialists. Puig i Elias defended this analysis before other anarchists who want to, at least, attempt libertarian teaching. Because of this he quickly received the support of the UGT and the Generalitat de Catalunya.

The first thing they did (during August, on full school holidays) was to analyze their needs and find out what was available. Some 157,000 school places were estimated to be covered. According to Ramón Navarro, during the first year, they were practically covered. But due to the war, many teachers had marched to the fronts, and between this and due to the increase in students another 3,000 new teachers were needed. For the 1936-1937 academic year, 2,000 were enabled, but even so the places were filled with people who did not have the corresponding degree.

Most of the teachers were unionized in the UGT, which caused most schools to end up under their influence. But the UGT not only joined Socialists and Communists, but also Catalanists and Republicans. Practically all those who were not sympathizers of the CNT joined the UGT.

The New Unified School was conceived as the village school for all the children of the Nation, which was to have all degrees of education, from kindergarten to university, free in all grades. It was created and supported by the State and the Generalitat, and directed, by the technical and administrative part, by a Superior Council made up of people who represented all levels of education. It was not defined as a uniformed school, but as an egalitarian school. It could admit different processes, schedules and special ways of doing and teaching, but it had to have a list of all the teaching and school activities within the same system that complied with some principles. It had to have a continuity and to respect the characteristics of each stage of development from child to young adult.

This transformation brought about changes in the legislation and in the educational system of Catalunya. The aim was a General Education Plan that contained very innovative aspects such as the approach of a common cycle of unified compulsory studies that begins from the nursery school, the relationship between primary and secondary education, a solid humanistic training in all university studies including technicians, the integration of the disabled, the care of those with learning disabilities and professional orientation aspects, the attempt to generalize the renewed teaching, etc.

Different visions of the political forces were integrated in the Council when realizing this project in practice, so the CENU happened to have a mission of informant and adviser of the Council of Culture.

General Education Plan 

The Education Plan was based on the following three bases:
 Teaching begins as soon as the child is born and continues until the total technical and spiritual formation of the human. By starting early and for all it facilitates equal education. There are no a priori differences that subsequently impair the child's education.
 Coexistence with each other is obligatory, without distinction of origin or purpose: coexistence provides to a great extent the selection according to the personal relations of each one. Homogenization, from the beginning, helps to avoid social impact. 
 Further selection will be based on individual factors: teaching must discover and develop the abilities of each, also taking into account personal desires and desires.

New School Inspirations: The Rousseau Institute, Montessori, Freinet and Decroly 
Many Catalan pedagogues studied at the Jean-Jacques Rousseau Institute in Geneva, which had a considerable influence on the modernization of the school system. This institute was not only inspired by the philosophical work of Jean-Jacques Rousseau, but also by the scientific psychology of Édouard Claparède, Pierre Bovet, Jean Piaget, Mina Audemars and Louise Lafendel. The Escola Nova was inspired by three then modern education methods: Montessori, Freinet and Decroly, which all wanted to replace traditional teaching, such as "one size fits all", authoritarian and ex cathedra education, with an active, interactive, social and more fun approach that applied the principles of developmental psychology:

 Maria Montessori created the Montessori method, inspired by the principles of Friedrich Fröbel. The purpose was to help children develop their full potential, rather than learning to pass tests. Research shows that when the method is well implemented, children's outcomes, even in tests, are superior to those obtained with regular school methods. On the other hand, the ideological and formal approaches of the method of Italian pedagogy, united with many reformist ideas of the Catalan bourgeoisie. It was first introduced in Catalonia by Joan Palau i Vera.

 The Freinet method aims to build a more just and supportive society. Célestin Freinet started from egalitarian ideas and the principles of trust and mutual respect: being bigger than the student does not mean being above them. It is not learned by assimilating laws and rules recited from a podium, but by experience. Childhood in itself is a valuable stage in a person’s life. The child is not a potential adult. The school must propose functional activities, useful for life. It conceived the school as a democratic and cooperative community where they learn to live in democracy.

 The Decroly method takes the interests and needs of children as a starting point. Ovide Decroly proved that children are more motivated to be protagonists in their own learning. For him, teaching must respond to the needs of the human being and not just to mere knowledge. It distinguishes primary needs (eating, drinking, resting), secondary needs (self-love, approval, admiration), social, sexual, and maternal needs, increasingly adapted to the stage of development. Work is thematically based on real-life experiences and observations, to which the branches (language, mathematics, science, history and practical skills) are applied.

Inspired by these ideas, CENU had to train teachers and create the necessary spaces, adapted to each group: kindergartens, primary school, secondary school and higher education.

School buildings 
The Municipal Commission of Culture of the City council was in charge of constructing public schools. At that time, teaching was often given in any building, not very adapted to the pedagogical needs: stable, the ground floor of a hospital, or in high-rise rooms, with poor hygienic conditions and acoustics, and so overcrowded that only absolute silence and discipline could guarantee some order. In the Catalan Countries, there were 9047 buildings at the time, not always very suitable and 7882 new ones were missing to meet educational needs.

Immediate and end goals 
In the short term, the Council had to combat illiteracy, which in 1930 was 12% of men and 24% of women in Barcelona, and 24% and 40% throughout Spain. In addition, the transition from primary to secondary school needed to be facilitated, especially for students with needy families and also to improve training in pedagogy and teaching staff methodology for both teachers and university students who wanted to devote themselves to teaching. Secondary technical studies had to be reorganized to enable the transition to higher or university education.

In the medium term, it was planned to improve and expand the infrastructure, in order to reduce the number of students per class, have a primary school with a section for children by municipality as well as an institute for each municipality with more than five thousand inhabitants. The council aspired to free and compulsory education for all up to the age of eighteen. Continuing in higher education should be possible for everyone who has talent, and could no longer be conditioned by social background. It was planned to create a network of learning and working schools, called "Technicum" and to facilitate active teachers to pursue university training in parallel.

Ideology and criticism
The CENU was a distinctly anti-fascist body. For this reason, ideological purges were carried out on several occasions, removing right-wing and Catholic teachers from their posts. These purges caused protests by Manuel de Irujo (PNV), from the central government. The ideological control of the teaching staff was accentuated once the anarchists lost the leadership of the CENU. In June 1937, the requirements to be a teacher increased. All those who are suspected of not being sufficiently "politically related" were excluded.

But Puig i Elias came from a libertarian background, understanding education as a tool to achieve a harmonious and peaceful society. He stated that the school:

He said this during the middle of the Spanish Civil War. Despite the hatreds experienced, the text spoke of the neutrality of education: "if Catholics wanted to make Catholics and socialists, socialists, anarchists do not want to make anarchists, what we propose is to make people." Anarchist education was permeated with this naturalistic stance on the natural goodness of children. This defense of the ideological neutrality of education was not shared by the UGT, which defended an indoctrinating education to establish a new revolutionary order. It was intended to inculcate republican ideals in order to discard any "fascist deviation" of the student.

But Puig Elias also had to justify himself to anarchist teachers. They came to see CENU as a "deviation" from anarchist principles, since it was at the disposal of the state. For the sector opposed to CENU, it was too close to socialist policies. This sector was formed, above all, by the Regional Federation of Rationalist Schools and the Libertarian Youth. Joan's brother, Josep, responded to these accusations by saying that the CENU put into practice with facts and not with vague statements the program approved at the Zaragoza Congress of the CNT, held in May 1936.

Outstanding schools

Escola del Mar 
On March 7, 1921, the president of the Culture Commission of Barcelona City Council commissioned the Ribas i Pradell house to build wooden pavilions for the future Escola del Mar, on Barceloneta beach. Ventura Gassol, a city official, asked Pere Vergés if he would like to become its director.

Vergès accepted the proposal. On the first of July, the building, not yet completely finished, hosted the Children's Baths of the Sea, and on the first of August, in addition to the bathing schedule, it was inaugurated as a beach semi-colony. A year later, the Commission of School Colonies inaugurated, as an extension of the Escola del Mar, the first school colony in Calafell with the name of Vilamar. Pere Vergés was a follower of the ideas of the New School. In this school they emphasized the importance given to music, the school library and physical education based on respiratory gymnastics and swimming.

Escola del Bosc 
The Escola del Bosc was built on the mountain of Montjuic by the architect Antoni Falguera who had studied similar buildings in Rome and Charlottenburg. Rosa Sensat wanted the school to be the place where one learns by living, with the aim of being able to synthesize the virtues of school and extracurricular education, articulating formal learning in the daily experiences of the environment.

Differences between the Traditional School and the New School

References 

Anarchism and education
Education in Catalonia
Spanish Revolution of 1936